Playa Grande (Spanish, Big Beach) may refer to:

 Playa Grande, Guatemala, the administrative center of Ixcán, Guatemala
 Playa Grande, Costa Rica, a beach town in Costa Rica
 Playa Grande, Uruguay, a village and resort in Maldonado, Uruguay
 Las Baulas National Marine Park, a Costa Rican national park also known as "Playa Grande Marine Turtle National Park"

See also
 Big Beach (disambiguation)
 Playa (disambiguation)